This is a list of Portuguese television related events from 1999.

Events
Unknown - Ricardo Sousa and Sandra Godinho win the sixth series of Chuva de Estrelas performing as Meat Loaf and Ellen Foley.

Debuts

International
 Dawson's Creek (Unknown)

Television shows

1990s
Chuva de Estrelas (1993-2000)

Ending this year

Births

Deaths